Arnold Oosterveer (born 1 March 1959) is a Dutch former football defender.

After his career, he started working for Soccer Vision, where he became the agent for amongst others Klaas-Jan Huntelaar.

References
 Profile
 Stats

External links
 Soccer Vision website

1959 births
Living people
Dutch footballers
Dutch sports agents
Eredivisie players
AZ Alkmaar players
Chamois Niortais F.C. players
Stade Rennais F.C. players
Valenciennes FC players
Ligue 1 players
SC Heerenveen players
Dutch expatriate footballers
Expatriate footballers in France
Association football defenders
Footballers from Groningen (city)
Association football agents